Frank Thomas may refer to:

Arts and entertainment
Frank M. Thomas (1889–1989), American actor, father of Frankie Thomas
Frank Thomas (animator) (1912–2004), American animator for Walt Disney
Frank Thomas (comics) (1914–1968), American cartoonist, creator of The Eye and Fantom of the Fair
Frankie Thomas (1921–2006), American actor and author
Frank Thomas (lyricist) (1936–2017), French songwriter
Frank Thomas (musician) (1943–2020), American singer, songwriter and guitarist
Frank J. Thomas (printer), American photographer, typographer, and printer

Sports
Frank Thomas (English cricketer) (1877–1924), English cricketer
Frank Thomas (American football) (1898–1954), American football player and coach
Frank Thomas (Australian footballer) (1905–2001), Australian rules footballer who played with Hawthorn and Sturt
Frankie Thomas (cyclist) (born 1907), Australian cyclist
Frank Thomas (Barbadian cricketer) (1924–2010), Barbadian cricketer
Frank Thomas (outfielder) (1929–2023), American baseball player
Frank Thomas (designated hitter) (born 1968), American baseball Hall of Fame player

Others
Frank Thomas (bishop) (1930–1988), English prelate of the Roman Catholic Church

See also
Francis Thomas (disambiguation)
Franklin Thomas (disambiguation)